Lenka Marušková née Hyková  (born 2 February 1985) is a retired Czech female sport shooter.

At the 2004 Summer Olympics, she won a silver medal in the women's 25 metre pistol, and also competed in the 10 metre air pistol.  She also competed in the same two events at the 2008 and 2012 Summer Olympics.

Her father, Vladimír, was also an Olympic-level sports shooter.

References

External links
 
 ISSF profile

1985 births
Czech female sport shooters
ISSF pistol shooters
Shooters at the 2004 Summer Olympics
Shooters at the 2008 Summer Olympics
Shooters at the 2012 Summer Olympics
Olympic shooters of the Czech Republic
Medalists at the 2004 Summer Olympics
Olympic medalists in shooting
Olympic silver medalists for the Czech Republic
Sportspeople from Plzeň
Living people
21st-century Czech women